Hélio Alonso University or FACHA is a private university founded on December 6, 1971, in Rio de Janeiro, Brazil by professor Hélio Alonso (1929-2015). It has two campi: one located in Méier and one in Botafogo.

External links
 Faculdades Integradas Hélio Alonso website

Educational institutions established in 1971
Private universities and colleges in Brazil
Universities and colleges in Rio de Janeiro (city)
1971 establishments in Brazil